2022 Championship League may refer to:

2022 Championship League (invitational), a snooker tournament held between December 2021 and February 2022
2022 Championship League (ranking), a snooker tournament held between June and July 2022